This article presents a list of the historical events and publications of Australian literature during 1949.

Books 

 James Aldridge – The Diplomat
 Martin Boyd – Such Pleasure
 Jon Cleary – The Long Shadow
 Charmian Clift & George Johnston – High Valley
 Jean Devanny – Cindie : A Chronicle of the Canefields
 Philip Lindsay
 All That Glitters
 The Loves of My Lord Admiral
 Alan Marshall – How Beautiful Are Thy Feet
 Ruth Park – Poor Man's Orange
 E. V. Timms – The Pathway of the Sun
 June Wright – So Bad a Death

Short stories 

 Vance Palmer – "Mathieson's Wife"
 Dal Stivens – "The Pepper Tree"
 Judah Waten – "Neighbours"

Poetry 

 John Blight – "Into the Ark"
 David Campbell – Speak With the Sun
 Rosemary Dobson
 "Ampersand"
 "The Missal"
 Geoffrey Dutton – "Wool-Shed Dance"
 Nan McDonald – "Wet Summer : Botanic Gardens"
 Kenneth Mackenzie – "Table-Birds"
 Elizabeth Riddell
 "News of a Baby"
 "Wakeful in the Township"
 Roland Robinson – Language of the Sand : Poems
 David Rowbotham – "Nine O'Clock : By the Bunya Mountains"
 Douglas Stewart
 "Nodding Greenhood"
 "Terra Australis"
 Judith Wright
 "The Old Prison"
 Woman to Man

Drama 

 Max Afford – Dark Enchantment

Awards and honours

Literary

Children's and Young Adult

Poetry

Births 

A list, ordered by date of birth (and, if the date is either unspecified or repeated, ordered alphabetically by surname) of births in 1949 of Australian literary figures, authors of written works or literature-related individuals follows, including year of death.

 8 February – Nigel Krauth, novelist and academic
 22 March – Alan Gould, novelist
 7 April – Jennifer Maiden, poet
 30 April – Nadia Wheatley, biographer and writer for children
 15 August – Garry Disher, novelist
 6 November – Barry Dickins, author and playwright

Unknown date
 Ken Bolton, poet
 Judith Brett, historian and academic
 Steven Carroll, novelist
 Jennifer Compton, poet and playwright
 Laurie Duggan, poet
 John Jenkins, poet
 Don Watson, author

Deaths 

A list, ordered by date of death (and, if the date is either unspecified or repeated, ordered alphabetically by surname) of deaths in 1949 of Australian literary figures, authors of written works or literature-related individuals follows, including year of birth.

 3 April — Ada Augusta Holman, journalist and novelist (born 1869)
 15 August – Roderic Quinn, poet (born 1867)
 16 September – Marion Knowles, novelist, poet and journalist (born 1865)
 11 October – Sydney Ure Smith, publisher (born 1887)

See also 
 1949 in poetry
 List of years in literature
 List of years in Australian literature
1949 in literature
1948 in Australian literature
1949 in Australia
1950 in Australian literature

References

Literature
Australian literature by year
20th-century Australian literature
1949 in literature